Markopoulo (Greek: Μαρκόπουλο) is a settlement in the municipal unit of Tragano, Elis, Greece. It is about 1 km east of Tragano, on the road to Borsi. Markopoulo had a population of 125 in 2011.

Population

Geography

Markopoulo is situated 1.5 km north of the river Pineios.

Economy

Its main production are fruits including watermelon, melon, figs and vegetables including corn, tomatoes, potatoes, onions, cucumbers and others as well as dairy, livestock, olives and others.

External links
 Markopoulo GTP Travel Pages

See also

List of settlements in the Elis prefecture

References

Populated places in Elis